

Competitions

Primeira Liga

League table

Taça de Portugal Millenium

Third round

Fourth round

Fifth round

Quarter-finals

Semi-finals

Final

Taça da Liga

Second round

References

Academica
Associação Académica de Coimbra – O.A.F. seasons